Lee Patton (April 3, 1904 – March 8, 1950) was an American college basketball coach. He was the head coach at West Virginia University from 1946 to 1950.

He died of injuries sustained in a car accident on March 8, 1950, in Morgantown, West Virginia at age 45.

References

1904 births
1950 deaths
American men's basketball coaches
West Virginia Mountaineers men's basketball coaches